The men's K-1 500 metres competition in canoeing at the 2008 Summer Olympics took place at the Shunyi Olympic Rowing-Canoeing Park in Beijing.  The K-1 event is raced in single-person kayaks. This would be the last time the event would take place at the Summer Olympics. On 13 August 2009, it was announced by the International Canoe Federation that the men's 500 m events would be replaced by 200 m events at the 2012 Summer Olympics with one of them being K-1 200 m for the women. The other events for men at 200 m will be C-1, C-2, and K-1.

Competition consists of three rounds: the heats, the semifinals, and the final. All boats compete in the heats. The top six finishers in each of the four heats advances directly to the semifinal along with the top three times. The top three finishers in each of the three semifinals advance to the final.

Heats took place on August 19, semifinal on August 21, and final on August 23.

Schedule
All times are China Standard Time (UTC+8)

Medalists

Results

Heats
Qualification Rules:  1..6->Semifinals + 3 best next by time, Rest Out

Heat 1

Heat 2

Heat 3

Heat 4

Semifinals
Qualification Rules: 1..3->Final, Rest Out

Semifinal 1

Semifinal 2

Semifinal 3

Final

References 

 Sports-reference.com 2008 men's K-1 500 m results
 Yahoo! August 19, 2008 sprint heat results. - Accessed August 19, 2008.
 Yahoo! August 21, 2008 sprint semifinal results. - accessed August 21, 2008.
 Yahoo! August 23, 2008 sprint final results. - accessed August 23, 2008.

Men's K-1 500
Men's events at the 2008 Summer Olympics